Dream is a 2009 South Korean television series that follows the lives of a sports agent and K-1 fighters. Starring Joo Jin-mo, Kim Bum and Son Dam-bi (in her acting debut), it aired on SBS from July 27 to September 29, 2009 on Mondays and Tuesdays at 21:55 for 20 episodes.

Plot
Nam Jae-il is a successful sports agent with some famous clients, but when one of his baseball stars gets involved in a drug case, he loses everything. But when the miserable Nam befriends former pickpocket and aspiring K-1 fighter Lee Jang-seok, and tomboyish taebo instructor Park So-yeon, he decides to regain his glory by making Lee a star.

Cast
 Joo Jin-mo as Nam Jae-il
 Kim Bum as Lee Jang-seok 
 Son Dam-bi as Park So-yeon
 Park Sang-won as Kang Kyung-taek
 Choi Yeo-jin as Jang Soo-jin
 Oh Dal-su as Lee Young-chul
 Lee Ah-hyun as Jung Geum-ja
 Lee Ki-young as Park Byung-sam
 Lee Hoon as Park Jung-chul
 Yoo Hye-jung as Kim Sam-soon
 Yoo Yeon-seok as Noh Chul-joong
 Park Nam-hyun as Go Kwang-pal
 Kim Woong as Maeng Do-pil
 Go Chang-seok as "Straw"
 Lee So-jung as Jae-shi
 Hong Ah-reum as Song Yu-ri
 Chung Lim as "Achilles"
 Marco as "Apollo"
 Hyun Woo as "Narcissus"
 Julien Kang as "David"
 Bae Jung-nam as "Poseidon"
 Jo Jae-yoon as Gal-chi

Soundtrack

 Countdown – Shinee
 죽기 아니면 살기 (Live Or Die) – Bobby Kim
 Love Is Crying - Seo Young-eun
 Always – Someday
 Moonlight – Yoon Hwa Jae In
 Run – Lee Hyun-wook
 눈물을 삼켜 (Tears and Swallow) – Kan Jong-wook
 And Now - PSW
 Take Me - J.Y
 Lonely Dream - Oh Joon-sung
 Force The Game - Choi Wan-hee
 Breakdown – Choi Wan-hee
 White Dream - Choi Wan-hee
 Jerry's Theme - Choi Wan-hee
 Distorted Face - Ha Geun-young

References

External links
 Dream official SBS website 
 

Seoul Broadcasting System television dramas
2009 South Korean television series debuts
2009 South Korean television series endings
Korean-language television shows
South Korean sports television series